The 2018–19 season was Cheltenham Town's 132nd season in existence and their third consecutive season in League Two. Along with competing in League Two, the club participated in the FA Cup, EFL Cup and EFL Trophy.

The season covered the period from 1 July 2018 to 30 June 2019.

Players

First team squad

Competitions

Pre-season friendlies
The Robins revealed friendlies with Bristol City, Cirencester Town, Reading U23s, Evesham United, Birmingham City, Weston-super-Mare and Walsall.

League Two

League table

Results summary

Results by matchday

Matches
On 21 June 2018, the League Two fixtures for the forthcoming season were announced.

FA Cup

The first round draw was made live on BBC by Dennis Wise and Dion Dublin on 22 October. The draw for the second round was made live on BBC and BT by Mark Schwarzer and Glenn Murray on 12 November.

EFL Cup

On 15 June 2018, the draw for the first round was made in Vietnam. The second round draw was made from the Stadium of Light on 16 August.

EFL Trophy
On 13 July 2018, the initial group stage draw bar the U21 invited clubs was announced. The draw for the second round was made live on Talksport by Leon Britton and Steve Claridge on 16 November. On 8 December, the third round draw was drawn by Alan McInally and Matt Le Tissier on Soccer Saturday.

Transfers

Transfers in

Transfers out

Loans in

Loans out

References

Cheltenham Town
Cheltenham Town F.C. seasons